Bul (also called Buul, Boolik or Puluc) is a running-fight board game originating in Mesoamerica, and is known particularly among several of the Maya peoples of Belize and the Guatemalan highlands. It is uncertain whether this game dates back to the pre-Columbian Maya civilization, or whether it developed in the post-colonial era after the arrival of the Spanish conquistadores.

Descriptions of the game 

Stewart Culin described the game in the 24th Annual Report of the Bureau of American Ethnology: Games of North American Indians published in 1907. R. C. Bell referred to the game in Board and Table Games from Many Civilizations. Both of these descriptions were based on the eyewitness accounts of others.

Lieve Verbeeck, a linguist studying Mayan language, witnessed the modern version of the game being played by Mopan and Kekchi Maya in Belize:
But neither can I give you hard evidence that the corn game, as it is now still played by the Mopan and K'ekchi' Mayans, (who are neighbors), was known in ancient times. There is linguistic evidence that the ancient Mayans used to play games of chance. The name BUL occurs in several Mayan languages and always means to play with dice. Sometimes, by extension, it means "to lose with gambling". There is archaeological evidence that the Maya used square- and oval-shaped patolli boards. There are many sites throughout the Maya area where archaeologists found patterns of patolli boards carved in floors or benches. Unfortunately, there are no BUL boards found (yet??) ... Anyway I don't have any thrilling stories for you about famous BUL contests in ancient times. Only three Maya manuscripts were safeguarded from the Spanish conquerors. Up till now no reference to Maya board games was found. Of course, there are a few pictures displaying priests throwing corn or seeds for divination ... Culin's version of BUL is quite accurate. I observed the game being played by 10 men. They placed 25 grains of corn in a row. The game lasted for 3 hours because they played 5 variants.

History 

It is not known exactly when the game was developed or what the original rules were as very few records survived the invasion by the conquistadors between the 15th and 17th centuries. Stewart Culin organised the games in his anthology into those he thought had an influence from Europe in their creation. Bul is not listed among these, and in his opinion the game must have developed before Europeans arrived in Central America.

Rules for two players 

There are a variety of ways to play the game, as Verbeeck's account shows. The game could be played by two people, or by two equal-sized teams. The overall objective is to capture and subsequently kill the playing pieces of the opposition, so the game is in essence a war game. 

The playing area is divided into equal spaces using rods placed parallel to each other. The two players have control of a base at either end of the play area. The players take an even number of stones or figurines (or any suitable playing piece) and place them in their respective bases.

The movement of the stones is determined by the roll of four dice or bul (corn kernels). These are marked black on one side (typically with charcoal) so that they land showing either a yellow or black face. The number of marked faces showing determines how many spaces a stone can move:
 1 black – 1 space
 2 black – 2 spaces
 3 black – 3 spaces
 4 black – 4 spaces
 0 black (all yellow) – 5 spaces

Alternating turns, players roll the bul and move any of their stones the corresponding number of spaces toward the enemy base. A stone cannot move to a space already occupied by a friendly stone. If there is no other option but to do this, a player must pass.

When a stone lands on the same space as an enemy stone, the enemy stone is captured and is no longer controlled by the enemy player. The enemy stone is placed beneath the capturing stone to reflect its captured state. Every time the capturing stone moves, its prisoners are moved with it. If a stone lands on an enemy stone that already has prisoners, it captures that stone and its prisoners, and these are placed beneath it.  

When a stone captures an enemy stone, it immediately reverses direction and begins heading back to the home base. Once a stone and its prisoners reach home, any enemy stones are removed from the game, or killed. Friendly stones are liberated or returned to the set of stones that can be played.

A player wins once they kill every enemy stone.

Rules for teams 

Only two teams can play, and these must be of equal size. Five or six players per team is a common team size. Seven players per team was the maximum and two per team was the minimum. The game is played with one stone for each team member. Players on a team rotate who rolls the bul and moves a stone.

Variants 

The number of stones used by each player can be changed for a shorter or longer game as necessary. Players can also agree before the game that only a certain number of stones can leave the base and be in play at any one time (an example being that players can only have two stones in play outside the base).

The game length can be changed by having fewer spaces between the two bases. Verbeeck mentioned twenty-five dividing rods being used, but a much shorter game would be played using only nine or ten rods.

References

External links 
Game description – Pachisi and Ludo variants website 
Computer Bul – Shareware games
 – Puluc for Android
 
Mesoamerican sports

Abstract strategy games